Better Living is a 1998 American film featured in the Hamptons International Film Festival. It stars Roy Scheider and Olympia Dukakis, and includes Edward Herrmann.

Cast
Olympia Dukakis as Nora
Roy Scheider as Tom
Edward Herrmann as Jack
Deborah Hedwall as Elizabeth
Catherine Corpeny as MaryAnn
Wendy Hoopes as Gail
James Villemaire as Junior
Scott Cohen as Larry
Brian Tarantina as Danny
Jessy Terrero as Biker #1
Phyllis Somerville as Nellie
  Bill J. Vlasnic  Police Officer

External links
 

1998 films
American independent films
Films directed by Max Mayer
1998 comedy films
American comedy films
1990s English-language films
1990s American films